Estadi Comunal may refer to either of two football stadiums in Andorra:

 Estadi Comunal d'Aixovall in Aixovall
 Estadi Comunal d'Andorra la Vella in Andorra la Vella